Thomas Morgan (born 30 March 1977) is an Irish former footballer.

Career
Morgan had made his first appearance in the green shirt for the under-15s - against Northern Ireland in Belfast, as captain under manager Joe McGrath and had also played at under-16 and under-18.

Thomas Morgan came to prominence during the 1997 FIFA World Youth Championships where he captained the Irish team which won the bronze medal. During those championships he lined up alongside the like of Damien Duff to face players like Juan Román Riquelme and Esteban Cambiasso of Argentina. At that time he was on the books of Blackburn Rovers and was highly regarded by the club having signed on his sixteenth birthday. There were offers to play with English lower league clubs but Morgan decided to return to Ireland and signed for St Patrick's Athletic where he won back to back league titles in '98 and '99.

Morgan moved to Newry Town F.C. in the Irish League making a scoring debut at Omagh Town on 26 August 2000.

He returned to the League of Ireland where he spent time with  Bray Wanderers (39 total appearances), Shelbourne (where he won back to back league titles in '03 and '04) and Dundalk before joining Kildare County at the beginning of the 2006 season.

His first cousin is Wesley Hoolahan.

Honours
St Patrick's Athletic
League of Ireland Premier Division (2): 1997-98, 1998-99

Shelbourne
League of Ireland Premier Division (2): 2003, 2004

Ireland	 	
FIFA World Youth Championships
1997 - Republic of Ireland - Bronze medal

References

External links
Kildare Nationalist

League of Ireland players
St Patrick's Athletic F.C. players
Newry City F.C. players
Bray Wanderers F.C. players
Shelbourne F.C. players
Dundalk F.C. players
Kildare County F.C. players
NIFL Premiership players
Living people
1977 births
Republic of Ireland association footballers
Republic of Ireland under-21 international footballers
Republic of Ireland youth international footballers
Association football midfielders
Belvedere F.C. players
Association footballers from County Dublin
Republic of Ireland men's futsal players
Sporting Fingal F.C. players
Republic of Ireland international futsal players